Goltregoda of Cerdanya (920-963) was countess consort of Pallars by marriage to Lope I of Pallars and regent of the County of Pallars in 948-953 during the minority of her sons Borrell I of Pallars and Raymond II of Pallars.

Life
She was born to Miró II of Cerdanya. In 925, her father gave her the fief of Vilanova. She married count Lope of Pallars. Goltregoda played an important political role in Pallars, and are estimated to have convinced Lope to associate the county of Pallars to the east toward Catalonia.

After the death of her spouse in 948, she ruled as regent during the minority of her two sons. Not much is known of the events in Pallars during her regency, but her signature appears on state documents. In 953, she made her last signature on a state document as regent: after this year, her sons signed all documents and are assumed to no longer be under her regency.

 Issue 
Raymond II of Pallars
Borrell I of Pallars
Suñer I
Sunifredo
Riquilda

References

 «Diccionari Biogràfic de Dones: Goltregoda, de Cerdanya»
 Abadal i de Vinyals, Ramon d' (1955). Els comtats de Pallars i Ribagorça. Barcelona: Institut d'Estudis Catalans.

10th-century women rulers
10th-century Catalan people
10th-century Visigothic people
Regents of Spain
Spanish countesses
10th-century Spanish women
963 deaths
920 births